George W. Kindlin (September 11, 1868 – May 12, 1920) was a member of the Wisconsin State Assembly.

Biography
Kindlin was born on September 11, 1868 in Koshkonong, Wisconsin. He attended what is now the University of Wisconsin-Madison. Kindlin died on May 12, 1920. He was buried in Fort Atkinson, Wisconsin.

Career
Kindlin was elected to the Assembly in 1906. Additionally, he was Clerk of Koshkonong and Surveyor of Jefferson County, Wisconsin. He was a Democrat.

References

External links

People from Koshkonong, Wisconsin
Democratic Party members of the Wisconsin State Assembly
American surveyors
University of Wisconsin–Madison alumni
1868 births
1920 deaths
Burials in Wisconsin